Ryaba the Hen (Kurochka Ryaba) is an Eastern Slavic folktale.

A very short version of this story goes as follows: There lived an old man and an old woman, and they had a hen called Ryaba. One day, the hen laid an egg — not a simple egg, but a golden one. The old man tried to break it, but could not, the old woman tried to break it, but could not. A mouse was running by, swayed its tail, the egg fell and broke. The old man is crying, the old woman is crying. "Don't cry", says Ryaba the hen, "I'll lay you a new egg, not a golden egg, but a simple one".

Films based on the tale:
 About an Old Man, an Old Woman and Their Hen Ryaba
 Assia and the Hen with the Golden Eggs

Russian folklore
Ukrainian folklore
Slavic folklore